Maria Louisa "Briar" Gardner (29 July 1879 – 20 October 1968) was a New Zealand potter and speech therapist.

Early life
Gardner was born on 29 July 1879 in Hobsonville, Auckland, to Louise (née Clark) and John Gardner. As a child she was tutored at home before spending two years at Araparera School after it opened in 1893.

Growing up, her family was involved in the pottery industry: her uncles owned the Amalgamated Brick and Pipe Company, while her brothers established a brickworks in 1902 at New Lynn - with guidance from Gardner, they later expanded into domesticware and became known as Crown Lynn. She moved to live with her brothers at New Lynn.

Career
Gardner became increasingly interested in creative arts and began embroidery, tapestry and painting, spending some time in Australia studying these crafts and exhibiting her decorative needlework in Auckland in 1920. She began taking classes at Elam School of Fine Arts, studying sculpture under William Wright and learning about Māori design from artist and illustrator Trevor Lloyd.

Gardner became interested in pottery when English potter Willam Speer came to work at New Lynn on a newly installed pottery wheel. Although he was largely discouraging, she began to teach herself pottery, beginning at 5.30am and working for two hours until Speer came to work at 7.30 am. She experimented with different glazes and decorating materials, experiencing technical difficulties in her early works.

During the 1930s, her skill and recognition developed. She began regularly exhibiting her pottery through the Auckland Society of Arts in 1930. In 1937 she exhibited with the Waikato Society of Arts alongside four other women artists. The following year, she established a kiln and pottery studio at her family home. During the war years, demand for her work increased, and her work was sold throughout New Zealand, but particularly at the Auckland departments stores Smith & Caughey's and Milne & Choyce. Her pottery was also exported to Australia at times.

Style
In the mid-1930s, Gardner “was praised for the marked development in her work, particularly her use of ‘soft harmonious colourings’, ‘flowing glazes’ and Maori and indigenous plant motifs.”

Later life
By 1950, arthritis forced her to stop pottery, and in 1951 she trained as a speech and drama teacher. She died in Auckland on 20 October 1968.

Collections
Gardner's work is held in the collections of the Auckland War Memorial Museum and Museum of New Zealand Te Papa Tongarewa.

Further reading
 Briar Gardner in the collection of the Museum of New Zealand Te Papa Tongarewa
 Leading Ladies Exhibition resource published by Te Uru Waitakere Contemporary Gallery, 2017.
 
 Moyra Elliott and Damian Skinner,

References

1879 births
Artists from Auckland
New Zealand potters
New Zealand ceramicists
1968 deaths
Speech and language pathologists
Women potters
New Zealand women ceramicists